Andrea Gaudenzi was the defending champion but lost in the second round to Jürgen Melzer.

Nicolás Lapentti won in the final 7–5, 6–4 against Fernando Vicente.

Seeds
A champion seed is indicated in bold text while text in italics indicates the round in which that seed was eliminated.

  Jiří Novák (withdrew because of a right wrist injury)
  Nicolás Lapentti (champion)
  Albert Portas (first round, retired because of a neck problem)
  Jan-Michael Gambill (second round)
  Stefan Koubek (second round)
  Albert Montañés (quarterfinals)
  Andrea Gaudenzi (second round)
  Dominik Hrbatý (second round)

Draw

External links
 2002 International Raiffeisen Grand Prix Draw

Hypo Group Tennis International
2002 ATP Tour